Dichostereum is a genus of fungi in the Lachnocladiaceae family. The genus contains 13 species that have a widespread distribution.

Species

References

External links

Russulales
Russulales genera